Tarsus İdman Yurdu is a Turkish sports club based in Tarsus. Founded in 1923, the football team plays at the Tarsus Şehir Stadium, which has a capacity of 4,189. They were named as "Tarsus İdman Yurdu Erkutspor" between 1983–1986 during the chairmanship of Erkut Kuzeyman, who was also a businessman.

League participations
 TFF First League: 1969–72, 1980–83, 1984–88, 1991–95
 TFF Second League: 1967–69, 1972–80, 1988–91, 1995–01, 2002–11, 2012–16, 2018–
 TFF Third League: 2001–02, 2011–12, 2016–18
 Turkish Regional Amateur League: 1983–84

Current squad

References

External links
Official website
Tarsus İdman Yurdu on TFF.org

Sport in Mersin
Football clubs in Turkey
Association football clubs established in 1923
1923 establishments in Turkey